The women's javelin throw event at the 2007 European Athletics U23 Championships was held in Debrecen, Hungary, at Gyulai István Atlétikai Stadion on the 14 and 15 July.

Medalists

Results

Final
15 July

Qualifications
14 July
Qualifying 52.50 or 12 best to the Final

Participation
According to an unofficial count, 16 athletes from 13 countries participated in the event.

 (1)
 (1)
 (1)
 (2)
 (3)
 (1)
 (1)
 (1)
 (1)
 (1)
 (1)
 (1)
 (1)

References

Javelin throw
Javelin throw at the European Athletics U23 Championships